Korean Vietnamese or Vietnamese Korean may refer to:
 North Korea–Vietnam relations
 South Korea–Vietnam relations
 Multiracial people of mixed Korean and Vietnamese descent
 Lai Daihan, persons born to South Korean soldier fathers and Vietnamese mothers during the Vietnam war
 Koreans in Vietnam
 Vietnamese people in Korea